Inside, Outside is a 1985 Herman Wouk novel telling the story of four generations of a Russian Jewish family and its travails in Russia and America. The book is a first person (and somewhat autobiographical) narrative told from the viewpoint of Israel David Goodkind, the third of the four generations in the book. Goodkind works in a minor bureaucratic post in the White House between March and October 1973; his insignificance gives him time to write his memoirs (the book itself, told as though Goodkind wrote it) while his position gives him opportunities to come face to face with the harried president Richard Nixon. Nixon never is named in the book, but there can be no doubt as to his identity. The narrative refers explicitly to the Watergate scandal, as an event contemporaneous with Goodkind's employment in the White House.

Plot summary
The story alternates between Goodkind's telling his family history and early years (specifically, his first 26 years (1915–1941)) and his account of current events in 1973, leading up to the Yom Kippur War. The tales of Goodkind's early years describe his family – his mother and father, his sister, his mother's father and father's mother, his mother's half sister, and a tribe of more distant uncles, aunts and cousins (the 'Mishpokha', Yiddish for 'family'). After college, Goodkind works for Harry Goldhandler, a gag writer for radio comedies (very loosely based on David Freedman), and has a romance with showgirl Bobbie Webb. The tales of his present day in 1973 are centered on his wife, his daughter, their friends, and Peter Quat, a college friend who also worked for Goldhandler, and who had become a famous novelist for his sexually explicit characters and unflattering depictions of American Jewish life. Quat's books seem similar to the work of Philip Roth, but Roth did not attend Columbia nor work for Freedman.

As a young man, Goodkind becomes less observant, but his adult self has returned to the Orthodox practices of his father and grandfather. Goodkind as a child and young man is embarrassed by his first name Israel, mockingly shortened by several other characters to Izzy. In the last scene of the novel when Goodkind returns to the U.S. after the Yom Kippur War, he tells an El Al flight attendant to call him Israel.

References to history and geography
Among the famous people Goodkind comes face to face with in the course of the book besides Nixon are Golda Meir, Zero Mostel, Bert Lahr, Marlene Dietrich, John Barrymore, Ernest Hemingway, Leslie Howard, and the brothers George Gershwin and Ira Gershwin. Goodkind visits Israel during the Yom Kippur War, carries a secret letter from Golda Meir to Richard Nixon, and rides back to Israel with the U.S. Air Force airlift of supplies.

1985 American novels
Novels set in Russia
American historical novels